C91.3FM (ACMA callsign: 2MAC) is a commercial radio station broadcasting on the FM band at a frequency of 91.3 MHz to the Macarthur region of New South Wales in Australia.  This area includes the major centres of Campbelltown and Camden. The station is owned by WIN Corporation, the parent company of WIN Television. Due to government regulations, it can only broadcast at 1 kW ERP so as to limit its broadcast area.

Many people feel that the station filled the gap left by the departure of Edge 96.1 and WSFM from Western Sydney studios. Studios for both supposed Western Sydney stations are now in North Ryde. C91.3 is the only commercial station left truly broadcasting from Western Sydney studios.

History
Originally, when it started in 2001, the station played classic rock hits, with a little bit of current pop tracks, using the positioner "The Biggest Variety of Rock & Pop". In 2004, its music format shifted more towards CHR, and with it came a change of its positioner to "The Best Music in Macarthur". In early 2006, when Rob Doorey replaced Mal Lees (formerly of Triple M's Club Veg) & Mardi Cole, both now at other stations, for its breakfast slot, their positioner was changed to "Macarthur First".

The station features former Triple M jock, Stuart Cranney. From 2001 to 2005, he presented the "Classic 9 @ 9", in which he played 9 songs with a common theme. During 2006, the 9-10am slot was taken up by the final hour of Rob Doorey's "Macarthur Breakfast" program, in which it is the "At Work Network" and therefore, the "Classic 9 @ 9" was dropped from the station's schedule. Despite the dropping of his famous program, Stuart Cranney remained on the station, in the 10am-2pm slot, which was then moved back to 9am-12pm in 2007, as the finishing time for "Macarthur Breakfast" was brought back earlier to 9am. Stuart Cranney was made redundant by station management on 11 September 2008, but returned to the station in January 2011, presenting "Macarthur Breakfast" with Shano. Since his breakfast program finishes at 10am, his popular 9am music feature has also returned, now renamed "Cranney's 9 @ 9", since the "Classic 9 @ 9" name has been taken up by Sydney's classic hits station, WSFM. Chantel Armstrong replaced Stuart Cranney for the 9am-12pm slot, before being replaced by Rob Doorey in 2010, who has moved from "Macarthur Breakfast".

During 2010, Jabba presented "Macarthur Breakfast" with Shano & Mike Goldman presented the local drive program. Both left the station by the end of the year, as they have refused to move to Campbelltown, as it was important for the station to be as local as possible.

In 2012 Christian McEwan was brought in from sister station i98FM to replace Glenn 'Stolzy' Stolzenhein on the After Hours Show. In early 2014 he was then promoted to Drive.

Networking with i98FM
The station began increased networking with its sister station i98FM in the mid-2000s, however this has since largely come to an end. C91.3 has returned to live and local broadcasting in the last few years with i98's "The Backseat" replaced by a local drive program, presented by Mike Goldman. Mornings are now presented by Rob Doorey, Afternoons with Lyndal Rogers and March 2010 saw a new host for C91.3's Breakfast show - Jabba (formerly of Nova) with Shano.

In January 2012, the station dropped "After Hours with Stolzy" from i98 in favour of its local nights program, presented by Lyndal Rogers, who has moved from Afternoons.  Come February 2012, Lyndal moved to do nights on C91.3's Wollongong sister station, i98FM.

In July 2012, Christian McEwan became full-time nights presenter replacing Glenn "Stolzy" Stolzenhein.

Presenters
 Ally Redondo - Breakfast (5am-10am)
 David Archer - Days (10am-3pm)
 Jason  Bouman - Drive (3pm-8pm)
 Shano - weekends/fill in
 Silvio Roldan - Morning Traffic
 Scott Frappell - Afternoon Traffic
 Daniel Pizarro - Fill-in Traffic

News

Former C91.3FM journalists:
Kate Zifovich, Bron Matherson, Michelle Wildner, Peter Hand, Lindsay Fisher, Kathy Koutzas, Greg (Hendo) Hendricks, Meredith Marks, Michelle Zydower, Renee Criddle, Krista Thomas, Mia Agius, Julieanne Horsman, Sally Prosser, Tracey Callaghan, Loni Cooper, James Cregan, Angela Anderson, Kate Mitchel, Paul Glover, Jonathan Lea, Beth Link,  Michelle Taverniti & Kim Sexty

Hosts

Former C91.3FM announcers:
Christian McEwan, Annabella Leone, Stuart Cranney, Josh Webster, Lyndal Rogers, Chris Jarrold, Brad 'Coasty' Hunter, Mal Lees, Rob Duckworth, Marcus Paul, Maje Saba, Fairlie Hamilton, Bianca Dye, Jabba, Mike Goldman, Ryan Cram, Glenn "Stolzy" Stolzenhein, Greg Dimon, Jem Gold, Patrick "Captain Pat" McGeown, Byron Webb & John Backer.

References

External links
 https://www.radiotoday.com.au/c91-3fm-announces-christian-bella-for-breakfast/
 https://www.radiotoday.com.au/vale-stuart-cranney/
 C91.3 official station web site
 Farewell Captain Pat: Community says goodbye to respected radio presenter, emcee and humanitarian

Radio stations established in 2001
Radio stations in New South Wales
Hot adult contemporary radio stations in Australia
WIN Television